The Tennessee–Bulgaria National Guard Partnership is one of 25 (through 2023) European partnerships that make up the U.S. European Command State Partnership Program and one of 88 (through February 2023) worldwide partnerships that make up the National Guard State Partnership Program. The Republic of Bulgaria joined by signing a bilateral affairs agreement with the U.S. Department of Defense and the state of Tennessee in 1993. Since 2015 Bulgaria also contributes troops to the Resolute Support Mission as a member of NATO.

Tennessee and Bulgaria were paired because they share similar geographical and cultural features. During the years since 1993, they have exchanged hundreds of soldiers on travelling contact teams and familiarization visits. Tennessee soldiers have also participated in major military exercises in Bulgaria sponsored by the U.S. Air Force and the U.S. Army in Europe, such as Cornerstone, Bulwark; etc. Many Bulgarian villages have been influenced in a positive way through Humanitarian Assistance initiatives in conjunction with Mil-to-Mil interaction.

History

Prelude to the partnership
On November 15, 1990, the People's Republic of Bulgaria was voted out of existence by the 7th Grand National Assembly, a special convocation of representatives from the entire nation for purposes of making Constitutional changes. It had been convoked by the Bulgarian Constitutional Assembly election, 1990 on June 10 and 17. Of the 400 seats, the Bulgarian Socialist Party, a mutation of the former Bulgarian Communist Party, won a majority of 210.

Having abolished the People's Republic, the Grand Assembly created the Republic of Bulgaria on July 12, 1991. Its Constitution was the 4th in its history. It was defined to be a unitary parliamentary republic.

The People's Republic of Bulgaria had belonged to the Soviet-Union dominated Warsaw Pact, an alliance of Eastern-bloc nations founded to counter the North Atlantic Treaty Organization (NATO). Due to loss of numbers, the Warsaw Pact declared itself disbanded on July 1, 1991, shortly before the creation of the Republic of Bulgaria. The Soviet Union dissolved itself on December 25 of that year.

Russia and some states loyal to it went their own way with the Collective Security Treaty Organization of May 15, 1992. Most of the former Warsaw-pact nations were left hanging in the balance militarily; that is, the nature and function of their military establishments were uncertain. Russian forces had withdrawn or were withdrawing.

Initiation of the partnership
The first members of the Military Liaison Team arrived in Bulgaria in late July 1993. The team chief was Colonel Gary G. Chamberlin accompanied by three more US military personnel. Their arrival caused something of a stir. On August 13, 1993, Duma, the Sofia daily newspaper, reported that: "four unidentified American Specialists have been roaming about Sofia for about 10 days. Without the approval of the government and not known by whose invitation, the guests with US epaulets are staying in the capital’s hotel, Shipka. What are they doing here is not fully clear".

The liaison team's first task upon arrival was to develop a country work plan, a trying event. The plan, completed in November 1993, contained a list of 16 quarterly events, a plan for the next quarter of 44 events, and a yearly work plan of 15 core events. Although all of the first-quarter events could not be completed, the staff did schedule most of them during the remainder of 1994. The interoperability, mutual trust and understanding began to improve.

The partnership under NATO membership
Joint Contact teams continue to mature after Bulgaria's accession into NATO in 2004, EUCOM, Tennessee, and Bulgaria wanted to explore moving to the next step of complexity in engagement activities with respect to the State Partnership Program. The events that EUCOM proposed were to be the first time Tennessee National Guard units were to conduct their annual training in Bulgaria independent of a larger exercise. Several major SPP events need to be highlighted which have impacted either side in a significant way. Vigilant Sentry is an exercise which combined efforts of both the 118th TN Medical group, and the 168th Military Police Battalion. The Medical part objectives’ were to provide medical, dental and pediatric care to the rural population in a joint effort with the Bulgarian Ministry of Defense and through the Military Academy and in cooperation with the Military of Health. Sentry Lion is another interesting event which took place in 2006 at the third Bulgarian AF base at Graf Ignatievo. In this event the TN Air Guard provided C-5 Cargo Transports to move the logistical equipment and support personnel from Oregon to Bulgaria.

Since the inception of the Tennessee-Bulgaria State Partnership Program, the following are notable accomplishments:

More than 420 events have been executed since 1993.
31 SPP events have been executed since fiscal year 2009.
4 Operational Mentor and Liaison Team rotations
Military Police NATO Combat Readiness Evaluation (CREVAL)
Enriched military experiences and adopting new military concepts for both sides
The Bulgarian Armed Forces realized the importance of the NCOs and started implementing new policy which empowers the non-commissioned officers with a greater level of responsibilities.

FY2012 highlights
In FY12, the Army Rote Cadet Command executed the Culture and Language Proficiency Program. This is the very first time when American cadets came in Bulgaria to interact with their Bulgarian counterparts. The event has contributed to the increased adaptability of the U.S. participants when in a new environment and enriched their skill set to cope with a different and unknown cultural context. On the other hand, the Bulgarian General Harizanov, who runs the National Military University, has conveyed in his letter of gratitude to MG Haston, that his students and NCOs’ marks were dramatically improved and gives the credit to this bilateral event in particular. Furthermore, the very same event will be executed in FY13 and this time there will be three rotations of American cadets who will be at three different military installations.

Ten SPP events have been executed:

Visit of the TN Adjutant General to Bulgaria
Crew resources management
Combat readiness evaluation staff training
Pre-deployment preparation
Airdrop procedures
Bulgarian Ministry of Defense senior enlisted visit
Air Operations Center introduction and operations
Non-commissioned officers' visit to TN Air Force bases
Culture and language proficiency program event including an ADVON visit

Partnership focus
The following are EUCOM stated areas of focus for the Tennessee-Bulgaria partnership:

Foster national stability within NATO framework
Increase Bulgarian coalition contribution through Bulgarian Battle Group
Put the stress on military police events and interaction
More culture and language proficiency program rotations
Leadership and non-commissioned officers developments
Emergency management and disaster response

ISAF Cooperation and OMLT teams 
The Tennessee-Bulgaria State Partnership Program has accomplished a great deal in just 20 years. One of the most fruitful and unique initiatives is the so-called Operational Mentoring and Liaison Team (OMLT). Those rotations are part of the SPP portfolio. Its main objective was to bring together American and Bulgarian militaries and to train together spreading out their knowledge to their Afghans counterparts. There were the total of three Garrison OMLT rotations from 2009 to 2011, and one C55 OMLT. The initial trainings took place in the National Military University in the town of Veliko Tarnovo, Bulgaria and then continued in the Joint Multinational Readiness Center (JMRC) in Hohenfels, Germany. JMRC conducts several OMLT rotations each year, training multinational partners to ensure they are prepared for rotation to Afghanistan with the ability to train, advise and enable the Afghan National Army while possessing skills to survive on the battlefield. The Bulgarians have accomplished their objectives in ISAF – lead Core Training through executing different type of classes, such as IED training, M16 range, ANA doctrine, Log planning, CFF and CAS that were very useful for them. Different types of TTPs were rehearsed during those OMLT rotations, many valuable skills have been acquired during this interaction such as TSPs, reacting to ambushes, patrol drills, vehicle rollover training procedures, IED trainings, CAS, MEDEDVAC, call for fire.

One of the major engagements through SPP was the Bulgarian contingent in Afghanistan which consisted of 474 military personnel. They were involved in a wide range of military activities such as: mechanized company embedded into Italian Battle Group (Kabul) – 122 military personnel. The major tasks were patrolling and security of Invicta base and Kabul Airport; Security (guarding) platoon – 45 military personnel (protection of Waterhouse base and escort of logistical elements); recon team (five people); team for ATC of Kabul airport (two people); medical team (five people) – embedded into the French military hospital; guarding company -266 military personnel (protection and patrolling in the area of Kandahar airport); Bulgarian – US OMLT – Kandahar – seven Bulgarian military personnel; two medical teams (ten people) – embedded into the Spanish military hospital in Herat; two military personnel in the Hungarian PRT. In March 2009 the Bulgarians were withdrawn from that team.

References

Attribution

External links

National Guard (United States)
Military alliances involving the United States
Bulgaria–United States military relations
Projects established in 1993